Deli Rich-e Sofla (also Romanized as Delī Rīch-e Soflá) is a village in Margown Rural District, Margown District, Boyer-Ahmad County, Kohgiluyeh and Boyer-Ahmad Province, Iran. At the 2006 census, its population was 302, in 51 families.

References 

Populated places in Boyer-Ahmad County